Zadolje is a village in the hills south of Ribnica in southern Slovenia. The area is part of the traditional region of Lower Carniola and is now included in the Southeast Slovenia Statistical Region.

A small chapel in the settlement is dedicated to the Virgin Mary and was built in 1893.

References

External links
Zadolje on Geopedia

Populated places in the Municipality of Ribnica